Ocean City is a census-designated place (CDP) in Okaloosa County, Florida, United States.  The population was 5,594 at the 2000 census. It is part of the Fort Walton Beach–Crestview–Destin Metropolitan Statistical Area.

Geography
Ocean City is located at  (30.439798, -86.607079).

Demographics

As of the census of 2000, there were 5,594 people, 2,478 households, and 1,479 families residing in the CDP. The racial makeup of the CDP was 83.98% White, 7.01% African American, 0.64% Native American, 3.24% Asian, 0.05% Pacific Islander, 1.59% from other races, and 3.49% from two or more races. Hispanic or Latino of any race were 4.31% of the population.

There were 2,478 households, out of which 23.3% had children under the age of 18 living with them, 44.8% were married couples living together, 11.3% had a female householder with no husband present, and 40.3% were non-families. 31.8% of all households were made up of individuals, and 9.8% had someone living alone who was 65 years of age or older.  The average household size was 2.26 and the average family size was 2.83.

In the CDP, the population was spread out, with 20.9% under the age of 18, 9.8% from 18 to 24, 30.7% from 25 to 44, 23.3% from 45 to 64, and 15.3% who were 65 years of age or older.  The median age was 38 years. For every 100 females, there were 98.0 males.  For every 100 females age 18 and over, there were 98.3 males.

The median income for a household in the CDP was $35,759, and the median income for a family was $43,625. Males had a median income of $27,472 versus $23,049 for females. The per capita income for the CDP was $23,418.  About 5.9% of families and 8.6% of the population were below the poverty line, including 15.4% of those under age 18 and 6.2% of those age 65 or over.

References

Census-designated places in Okaloosa County, Florida
Census-designated places in Florida
Populated places on the Intracoastal Waterway in Florida